Walker Greenbank (LON: WGB) is a UK public company designing and manufacturing wallpaper and fabrics, with a history stretching back more than a century. It trades under several brands including Arthur Sanderson & Sons, Morris & Co., Zoffany and Harlequin. Walker Greenbank prints wallpaper through its subsidiary Anstey Wallpaper Company in a substantial plant in Loughborough which produces wallpapers by modern high-speed processes but also by hand and has the broadest range of production machinery in Europe. Fabrics are produced in Lancaster. 2016 sales were £88m and profits £10.4m.

References

Manufacturing companies of the United Kingdom
 
Wallpaper manufacturers